Thierry Bonalair (born 14 June 1966) is a French former professional footballer who played as a defender, most notably for FC Nantes. He is chief scout for Lille OSC.

External links
 

1966 births
Living people
French footballers
Association football defenders
Amiens SC players
FC Nantes players
AJ Auxerre players
Lille OSC players
Neuchâtel Xamax FCS players
Nottingham Forest F.C. players
FC Zürich players
Ligue 1 players
Premier League players
French expatriate footballers
French expatriate sportspeople in England
Expatriate footballers in England
French expatriate sportspeople in Switzerland
Expatriate footballers in Switzerland
Footballers from Paris